Carl-Johan Westregård (born 7 November 1984) is a Swedish film director and visual effects artist. His short film Cams premiered at the 71st Venice International Film Festival and was awarded the Special Jury Prize in the Lab Competition of the 2015 Clermont-Ferrand International Short Film Festival.

Videography

As lead artist

References

External links

 Swedish Film in Venice (Swedish Film Institute)

Living people
1984 births
Swedish film directors